William L. Gertz (born October 10, 1952) is the Chairman, President and CEO of the American Institute For Foreign Study (AIFS), a cultural exchange and educational travel company with 10 global locations, headquartered in Stamford, CT.

A native New Yorker, Gertz has more than 40 years of experience in international education and serves as a Trustee of the AIFS Foundation.  He is the Chair of the Alliance for International Exchange, a coalition of 90 cultural exchange organizations throughout the United States.

Education 
A graduate of SUNY Binghamton, Gertz studied journalism and majored in European history.

Gertz completed the Strategic Marketing Management Program at Harvard Business School. He received an Honorary Doctorate in International Relations from Richmond, The American International University in London.

Early years 
With his career in journalism, Gertz cultivated a greater appreciation for global issues and cultures.

After backpacking through Europe with his friends in the summer of 1973, Gertz moved to France where he experienced the European lifestyle. Once he returned to the United States in 1976, he entered the field of International Education and became marketing manager for the Council on International Educational Exchange (CIEE).

He later founded a marketing and public relations organization, which served a diverse roster of clients from artist Peter Max and numerous youth and student travel organizations such as British Tourist Authority.

In the early 1980s, Gertz became the Travel Editor for Transitions, an international education publication.

American Institute For Foreign Study (AIFS) 

In 1985, he joined AIFS as an Associate Marketing Director. In 1986, Gertz helped launch the United States’ first au pair agency, Au Pair in America, as a program of AIFS. Working with the U.S. Department of State, Au Pair in America helped established today’s au pair program orientation model. It is currently one of the largest au pair placement agencies in the world.

Gertz became Vice President of AIFS in 1990. In 1993, he created a Customer Relationship Management system for AIFS and launched the company’s first website a few years later.

In 1998, Gertz became the Chief Operating Officer of AIFS and in 2005, was named President and CEO.

Gertz and AIFS organized the Diversity in International Education forum in Washington, D.C. in 2010, a symposium designed to address the need for more diverse participation.

Under his leadership, AIFS programs such as Au Pair in America, Camp America, Cultural Insurance Services International and AIFS Study Abroad have grown with more than 40,000 participants worldwide each year.  AIFS was also named one of the top places to work in Connecticut by Workplace Dynamics and Hearst Newspapers in 2011 and again in 2015.

During his tenure at AIFS, Gertz has served on the Executive Board of the International Au Pair Association (IAPA) and EDU Educational Services, Inc. and on the Development Committee of NAFSA: Association of International Educators.

In 2014, AIFS celebrated its 50th year as a leading cultural exchange and educational travel organization. In 2017, Gertz created the Fearless Global Citizen campaign, a movement empowering youth to travel and embrace cultural diversity.

In February 2018, Gertz was elected Chairman of AIFS after the death of Sir Cyril Taylor. Later in 2018, AIFS Study Abroad was named the top-rated study abroad organization and program by GoAbroad.com based on 35,000 student reviews.

Gertz and AIFS acquired Global Experiences in May 2019, a program that offers international internship programs in Australia, Europe, Asia, Latin America, and the United States for college students.

In 2019, Gertz was awarded a Centennial Medal from the Institute of International Education (IIE), in recognition of his outstanding contributions to international education.

With the study abroad industry facing challenges during the Covid-19 pandemic, Gertz has been a vocal advocate for the return of the U.S. study abroad sector. “Countries are making great progress with the vaccine and testing," Gertz said in a March 2021 interview with PIE news. "We believe [we will see] a fairly robust 2022 with around 50% of 2019 levels. By 2024, we should be back to 330,000 U.S. study abroad students." In March 2021, he was also interviewed by the Foundation for Learning and Youth Travel Education (FLYTE).

Published works 
In 2015, Gertz co-authored, A Parent’s Guide to Study Abroad, published in both English and Spanish, which offers information for parents as they navigate the study abroad experience.

Among his other published works, Gertz has penned articles for educational publications including the IIE Networker Magazine and Youth Travel International.

Personal life 
Currently residing in Fairfield, Connecticut, Gertz lives with his wife Evelyn, a classical guitarist. They have two children.

References

1952 births
Harvard Business School alumni
Living people